Presidential elections were held in Ivory Coast on 28 October 1990. They were the first since the reintroduction of multi-party democracy a few months earlier.  For the first time, Félix Houphouët-Boigny, president since 1960, faced an opponent in Laurent Gbagbo, who had just returned from exile two years earlier.  Nonetheless, Houphouët-Boigny was elected to a seventh five-year term, winning 81.68% of the vote. Voter turnout was 69.2%.

Results

References

Ivory
1990 in Ivory Coast
Presidential elections in Ivory Coast